Nuit noire 17 octobre 1961 is a 2005 French television film directed by Alain Tasma.

Cast 
Clotilde Courau ... Sabine
Florence Thomassin ... Nathalie
Vahina Giocante ... Marie-Hélène
Atmen Kelif ... Tarek
Jalil Naciri ... Maurice
Thierry Fortineau ... Papon
Aurélien Recoing ... Somveille
Serge Riaboukine ... Brigadeiro Tiercé
Jean-Michel Portal ... Martin
Jean-Michel Fête ... Bertaut
Philippe Bas ... Delmas

Awards

References

External links

2005 drama films
2005 television films
2005 films
French television films
2000s French-language films
International Emmy Award for Best TV Movie or Miniseries
French drama films
2000s French films